Hydnellum staurastrum is a tooth fungus in the family Bankeraceae. Found in Malaysia, it was described as new to science in 1971 by Dutch mycologist Rudolph Arnold Maas Geesteranus.

References

External links

Fungi described in 1971
Fungi of Asia
Inedible fungi
staurastrum